Altan Khan of the Tümed (1507–1582; ; Chinese: 阿勒坦汗), whose given name was Anda (Mongolian: Алтан (Аньда); Chinese: 俺答), was the leader of the Tümed Mongols and de facto ruler of the Right Wing, or western tribes, of the Mongols. He was the grandson of Dayan Khan (1464–1543), a descendant of Kublai Khan (1215–1294), who had managed to unite a tribal league between the Khalkha Mongols in the north and the Chahars (Tsakhars) to the south. His name means "Golden Khan" in the Mongolian language.

Consolidation of power 
Borjigin Barsboladiin Altan was the second son of Bars Bolud Jinong, and a grandson of Batumongke Dayan Khan who had re-unified the Mongolian nobility in an attempt to regain the glory of the Yuan dynasty. Altan Khan ruled the Tümed and belonged to the Right Wing of the Mongols along with his elder brother Gün Bilig, who ruled the Ordos. After Gün Bilig's death in 1542, Altan became the de facto leader of the whole of the Right Wing and was given the title, "Tösheetü Sechen Khan".

When Bodi Alagh Khan, the Khagan of the Mongols from the Chahar, died in 1547, Altan forced Bodi Alagh's successor Darayisung Küdeng Khan to flee eastward. In 1551 Darayisung made a compromise with Altan in exchange for giving the title "Gegeen Khan" to him. Altan Khan, who controlled the Ordos tumen of the Huang He or Yellow River was well placed to keep pressure on the Chinese and the Oirat Mongols in Tibet while developing both agriculture and trade.

Altan Khan also founded the city of Köke Khota (Hohhot, meaning "The Blue City"), now the capital of the Inner Mongolia Autonomous Region of the People's Republic of China. There is an impressive statue of him in one of the city's main squares.

Alliance with the Gelug 

Altan Khan is particularly remembered for establishing ties between Mongolia and the religious leaders of the Tibetan Gelug order. Altan Khan first invited 3rd Dalai Lama to Tümed in 1569, but apparently he refused to go and sent a disciple instead, who reported back to him about the great opportunity to spread Buddhist teachings throughout Mongolia. In 1571, Altan Khan got the title "Prince of Shunyi" (Obedient and Righteous Prince) from the Longqing Emperor (March 4, 1537 – July 5, 1572), the 12th emperor of China (Ming dynasty). In 1573, Altan Khan took some Tibetan Buddhist monks prisoner. The emperor also gave the Prince of Shunyi's new capital a new name, Guihua, meaning "return to civilization". The prince became very interested in Gelukpa, and Beijing was happy to provide him with Tibetan lamas, Tibetan scriptures, and translations.

Sonam Gyatso accepted Altan Khan's invitation to Tümed in 1577. Altan Khan later had Thegchen Chonkhor, Mongolia's first monastery, built at the place of the meeting. Also, the ruler of the Khalkha Mongols, Abtai Sain Khan, rushed to Tümed to meet the Dalai Lama. The Erdene Zuu Monastery was built by him in 1586, at the site of the former Mongol capital of Karakorum following his adoption of Buddhism as the state religion. This monastery is also often (wrongly) referred to as the first monastery in Mongolia and it grew into a massive establishment. In 1792, it contained 68 temples and some 15,000 lamas.

Sonam Gyatso publicly announced that he was a reincarnation of the Tibetan Sakya monk Drogön Chögyal Phagpa (1235–1280) who converted Kublai Khan, while Altan Khan was a reincarnation of Kublai Khan (1215–1294), the famous ruler of the Mongol Empire and Emperor of China, and that they had come together again to cooperate in propagating the Buddhist religion.

Altan Khan designated Sonam Gyatso as "Dalai" (a translation into Mongolian of the name Gyatso, meaning "ocean"). As a result, Sonam Gyatso became known as the Dalai Lama which, since then, has been used as a title – frequently translated into English as "Ocean of Wisdom". The title was also posthumously given to Gendun Drup and Gendun Gyatso, who were considered Sonam Gyatso's previous incarnations. Thus, Sonam Gyatso was recognized as being already the 3rd Dalai Lama.

Sonam Gyatso never returned to Tibet but remained proselytizing among the Mongols. The Tümed Mongols and their allies were brought into the Gelug tradition, which was to become the main spiritual orientation of the Mongols in the ensuing centuries.

Sonam Gyatso's message was that the time had come for Mongolia to embrace Buddhism, that from that time on there should be no more animal sacrifices, there must be no taking of life, animal or human, military action must be pursued only with purpose and the immolation of women on the funeral pyres of their husbands must be abolished. He also secured an edict abolishing the Mongol custom of blood-sacrifices. "These and many other such laws were set forth by Gyalwa Sonam Gyatso and were instituted by Altan Khan."

A massive program of translating Tibetan (and Sanskrit) texts into Mongolian was commenced, with letters written in silver and gold and paid for by the Dalai Lama's Mongolian devotees. Within 50 years virtually all Mongols had become Buddhist, with tens of thousands of monks, who were members of the Gelug order, loyal to the Dalai Lama.

When Sonam Gyatso died in 1588, his incarnation – and thus, the new Dalai Lama – was Altan Khan's great-grandson.

Military exploits

Altan Khan led raids into the Ming dynasty in 1529, 1530 and 1542 returning with plunder and livestock. In 1550 he crossed the Great Wall and besieged Beijing, setting the suburbs on fire. In 1552 Altan Khan gained control of the remains of Karakorum, the old Mongol capital. Longqing Emperor, the reigning emperor of Ming dynasty was forced to grant special trading rights to the khanate, after signing a peace treaty with him in 1571, allowing it to trade horses for silks, which further strengthened it economically. Altan Khan was also granted the title Prince Shunyi ("prince who conforms to righteousness") from the emperor.

During his reign he made several successful military campaigns to the west against rebellious Oirats, Kazakhs, and Kyrgyz, bringing them back under his rule.

Death
Altan Khan died in 1582, only four years after meeting with the Third Dalai Lama. He was 74 or 75 years old at the time.

Succession

Altan Khan's title Prince of Shunyi was succeeded by his son Sengge Düüreng who was supported by the Ming court of China. Altan Khan's great-grandson, Yonten Gyatso, was selected as the 4th Dalai Lama.

See also
 Altan Khan of the Khalkha

References

Sources 
 McKay, A. (editor) (2003): History of Tibet. Publisher: RoutledgeCurzon. 

16th-century Mongol rulers
Tibetan Buddhists from Mongolia
Converts to Buddhism
Converts to Buddhism from Islam
Mongolian Buddhists
1507 births
1582 deaths
Mongolian Buddhist monarchs